Mariano Garrigó (b. 1810; d. unknown)  was President of Honduras 10–20 August 1839.

Year of birth missing
Year of death missing
Presidents of Honduras
19th-century Honduran people